Scaraboides is a monotypic genus of flowering plants belonging to the family Apiaceae. Its only species is Scaraboides manningii. Its native range is South African Republic.

References

Apioideae
Monotypic Apioideae genera